Augusto Vargas Cortés (born 26 March 1962) is a Colombian footballer. He played in one match for the Colombia national football team in 1991. He was also part of Colombia's squad for the 1991 Copa América tournament.

References

External links
 

1962 births
Living people
Colombian footballers
Colombia international footballers
Association football defenders
People from Tumaco
Deportivo Cali footballers
Independiente Medellín footballers
Deportes Quindío footballers
Atlético Huila footballers
Cúcuta Deportivo footballers
Sportspeople from Nariño Department